Nite City (Also known as Ray Manzarek's Nite City) was an American rock band formed in Los Angeles, United States in 1977 by former Doors member Ray Manzarek. The band consisted of lead singer Noah James, bassist Nigel Harrison who later achieved greater success as a bassist for the rock band Blondie,  guitarist Paul Warren, drummer Jimmy Hunter and keyboardist Ray Manzarek. The group recorded and released two studio albums in 1977 and 1978 and one live album in 1977 on the 20th Century Record label. The band's music sold poorly and the group failed to acquire any sales or following. Soon after the release of their second studio album, Golden Days Diamond Nights, which was released only in West Germany, Nite City disbanded.

Band members
 Ray Manzarek – keyboards & vocals
 Jimmy Hunter – drums & vocals
 Noah James – lead vocals (debut album only)
 Nigel Harrison – bass
 Paul Warren – guitar & vocals

Discography 
 Nite City (1977)
 Starwood Club, Los Angeles. 02/23/1977 (1977)
 Golden Days Diamond Nights (1978)

References

 

Musical groups from Los Angeles